Ferris N'Goma (born 15 June 1993) is a French professional footballer who plays as a forward for Championnat National club Châteauroux.

N'Goma has represented France at a youth international level, but remains eligible for the France and DR Congo national teams.

Career statistics

References

External links
 
 

1993 births
Living people
Association football forwards
French footballers
France youth international footballers
Democratic Republic of the Congo footballers
French sportspeople of Democratic Republic of the Congo descent
Ligue 1 players
Ligue 2 players
Championnat National players
Championnat National 2 players
Championnat National 3 players
Montpellier HSC players
Limoges FC players
US Orléans players
Stade Brestois 29 players
Black French sportspeople